Oulad Hassoune Hamri is a small town and rural commune in Rehamna Province of the Marrakesh-Safi region of Morocco. At the time of the 2004 census, the commune had a total population of 8554 people living in 1228 households.

There is very little rainfall throughout the year, an average of 288mm this is referred to as a local steppe climate. The average temperature is 17.7 °C.

References

Populated places in Rehamna Province
Rural communes of Marrakesh-Safi